The Pistol Mitralieră model 1996 RATMIL (also called the RATMIL model 96) is a  blowback operated, folding stock submachine gun chambered in 9mm Luger used by the Romanian gendarmes. Initially developed as the 9mm PM md. 96, the developer's name, back then RATMIL, was added to the name, in order to distinguish it from the Assault SMG, also called PM md. 96.

Design details 
The RATMIL PM md. 96 submachine gun is a simple blowback weapon, firing from open bolt in full automatic or single shots. It features stamped steel receiver and short slotted barrel jacket, with muzzle compensator at the front. The manual safety / fire mode selector is patterned after Kalashnikov AK assault rifle. Weapon is fitted with side-folding metallic buttstock and a polymer furniture (pistol grip and short forend). Iron sights consist of the L-shaped flip-up rear (marked for 50 and 100 meters) and protected front sight.

Users 

 Romanian Gendarmerie

Gallery

See also 
 Norinco Type 79
 Vityaz-SN
 Bizon

References 

 Uzinele Mecanice Cugir website

Submachine guns of Romania
9mm Parabellum submachine guns